French peasants were the largest socio-economic group in France until the mid-20th century. The word peasant, while having no universally accepted meaning, is used here to describe subsistence farming throughout the Middle Ages, often smallholders or those paying rent to landlords, and rural workers in general. As industrialization developed, some peasants became wealthier than others and drove investment in agriculture. Rising inequality and financial management in France during the late 18th century eventually motivated peasants to revolt and destroy the feudal system. Today peasants could no longer be said to exist as an economic or social group in France. although many attempts have been made to honor and preserve this traditional way of life.

1500 to 1780s
By the middle of the 16th century, France's demographic growth, its increased demand for consumer goods, and its rapid influx of gold and silver from Africa and the Americas led to inflation (grain became five times as expensive from 1520 to 1600), and wage stagnation.  Although many richer land-owning peasants and enterprising merchants had been able to grow rich during the boom, the standard of living fell greatly for poor rural peasants, who were forced to deal with bad harvests at the same time.  This led to reduced purchasing power and a decline in manufacturing.  The monetary crisis led France to abandon (in 1577) the livre as its money of account, in favor of the écu in circulation, and banning most foreign currencies.

Meanwhile, France's military ventures in Italy and (later) disastrous civil wars demanded huge sums of cash, which were raised with through the taille and other taxes. The taille, which was levied mainly on the peasantry, increased from 2.5 million livres in 1515 to 6 million after 1551, and by 1589 the taille had reached a record 21 million livres. Financial crises hit the royal household repeatedly, and so in 1523, Francis I established a government bond system in Paris, the "rentes sure l'Hôtel de Ville".

In the 17th century rich peasants who had ties to the market economy provided much of the capital investment necessary for agricultural growth, and frequently moved from village to village (or town). Geographic mobility, directly tied to the market and the need for investment capital, was the main path to social mobility. The "stable" core of French society, town guildspeople and village laborers, included cases of staggering social and geographic continuity, but even this core required regular renewal. Accepting the existence of these two societies, the constant tension between them, and extensive geographic and social mobility tied to a market economy holds the key to a clearer understanding of the evolution of the social structure, economy, and even political system of early modern France. Collins (1991) argues that the Annales School paradigm underestimated the role of the market economy; failed to explain the nature of capital investment in the rural economy, and grossly exaggerated social stability.

1789-1945

France faced a series of major economic crises after 1770. Because of very expensive wars, and inadequate financial system, the government was virtually bankrupt. From the point of view of the peasants, rapid population growth, harvest failures, physiocratic calls for modernization of agriculture, and rising seigneurial dues motivated peasants to destroy feudalism in France. They played a major role in starting the French Revolution in 1789. However most quickly retired from active political involvement.

19th century modernization of peasants
France was a rural nation as late as 1940, but a major change took place after railways started arriving in the 1850s–60s. In his seminal book Peasants Into Frenchmen (1976), historian Eugen Weber traced the modernization of French villages and argued that rural France went from backward and isolated to modern and possessing a sense of French nationhood during the late 19th and early 20th centuries. He emphasized the roles of railroads, republican schools, and universal military conscription. He based his findings on school records, migration patterns, military service documents and economic trends. Weber argued that until 1900 or so a sense of French nationhood was weak in the provinces. Weber then looked at how the policies of the Third Republic created a sense of French nationality in rural areas. The book was widely praised, but was criticized by some, such as Ted W. Margadant, who argued that a sense of Frenchness already existed in the provinces before 1870.

Protectionism
French national policy was protectionist with regard to agricultural products, to protect the very large agricultural population, especially through the Méline tariff of 1892.  France maintained two forms of agriculture: a modern, mechanized, capitalistic system in the Northeast, and in the rest of the country a reliance on subsistence agriculture on very small farms with low income levels.

Since 1945

Modernization of the traditional/subsistence farming sector began in the 1940s, and resulted in a rapid depopulation of rural France, although protectionist measures remained national policy. With government support, younger, more active farmers bought out their neighbors, enlarged their properties, and used the latest in mechanization, new seeds, fertilizers, and new techniques. The result was a revolution in agricultural output, as well as a sharply reduced number of active farmers from 7.4 million in 1946 to only 2 million in 1975.  It also resulted in millions of empty old farm houses. They were promptly purchased and upgraded by Frenchmen who wanted a rural retreat away from the frenzy of their primary work in the cities. Many did this out of nostalgia about family memories of rural living that drew the city dwellers back to the countryside.  By 1978, France was the world leader in per capita ownership of second homes and L’Express reported an "irresistible infatuation of the French for the least Norman thatched house, Cévenol sheep barn or the most modest Provençal farmhouse."

Numerous organizations since the 1930s have emerged to  preserve and enhance the position of the small farm in France, with a wide range of ideological approaches from far left to far right.  They all seek to honor the tradition and fund the surviving farmers, and mobilize their political support.

The media became deeply involved, especially the postwar French film industry. Film depicted the exodus from countryside to city as a threat to France's historic role as a traditional, agrarian society. Documentaries celebrated the enormous power of modern machinery and electrification, while fictional dramas portrayed the joy of city dwellers who returned to the wholesome atmosphere of the country.

See also
 Economic history of France
 History of France
 Peasant
 Peasants' War (1798), revolt in 1798 against the French occupiers of the Southern Netherlands
 Siege of Malta (1798–1800). which began as a peasant uprising against French rule in 1798

Notes

Further reading

Before 1789
 Beech, George T. Rural Society in Medieval France (1964)
 Bloch, Marc. Feudal society (Société féodale) (1961) classic from Annales School
 Braudel, Fernand. Civilization and capitalism, 15th-18th century (Civilisation matérielle, économie et capitalisme)  (3 vol 1992)
 Farmer, Sharon A. Surviving poverty in medieval Paris: gender, ideology, and the daily lives of the poor (Cornell UP,  2002) 
 Goubert, Pierre. The French peasantry in the seventeenth century (1986)
 Kettering, Sharon. French Society: 1589-1715 (2014).
 Hoffman, Philip T. Growth in a traditional society: the French countryside, 1450-1815 (Princeton UP, 1996) 
 Le Roy Ladurie, Emmanuel. The peasants of Languedoc (Paysans de Languedoc) (University of Illinois Press, 1974) influential product of Annales School
 Ridolfi, Leonardo. “The French economy in the longue durée: a study on real wages, working days and economic performance from Louis IX to the Revolution (1250–1789).” European Review of Economic History 21#4  (2017): 437-438.
 Sée, Henri Eugène. Economic and social conditions in France during the eighteenth century (1927)  pp 14–59 online

Since 1789
 Ardagh, John. France in the 1980s (1982) pp 206–57.  older edition
 Berger, Suzanne. Peasants against politics: rural organization in Brittany, 1911-1967 (Harvard UP, 1972).
 Devlin, Judith. The superstitious mind: French peasants and the supernatural in the nineteenth century (Yale UP, 1987).
 Edelstein, Melvin. "Integrating the French peasants into the nation-state: The transformation of electoral participation (1789–1870)." History of European Ideas (1992) 15.1-3: 319-326.
 Golob, Eugene. The Meline tariff: French Agriculture and Nationalist Economic Policy (Columbia University Press, 1944) online
 McPhee, Peter. "The French Revolution, peasants, and capitalism." American Historical Review 94.5 (1989): 1265-1280. online
 Margadant, Ted W. French peasants in revolt: The insurrection of 1851 (Princeton UP, 1979).
 Markoff, John. Abolition of Feudalism: Peasants, Lords, and Legislators in the French Revolution (Penn State Press, 2010).
 Markoff, John. "Peasants help destroy an old regime and defy a new one: some lessons from (and for) the study of social movements." American Journal of Sociology 102.4 (1997): 1113-1142.
 Pinchemel, Philippe. France: A Geographical, Social and Economic Survey (1987)
 Schwartz, Robert M. "Rail transport, agrarian crisis, and the restructuring of agriculture: France and Great Britain confront globalization, 1860–1900." Social Science History 34.2 (2010): 229-255.
 Sutherland, D. M. G. "Peasants, Lords, and Leviathan: Winners and Losers from the Abolition of French Feudalism, 1780-1820," Journal of Economic History (2002) 62#1 pp. 1–24 in JSTOR
 Weber, Eugen. "The Second Republic, Politics, and the Peasant", French Historical Studies 11#4 (1980), pp. 521–550 (in JSTOR).
 Weber, Eugen. Peasants into Frenchmen: the modernization of rural France, 1870-1914 (Stanford UP, 1976).
 Cabo, Miguel, and Fernando Molina. "The Long and Winding Road of Nationalization: Eugen Weber's Peasants into Frenchmen in Modern European History (1976—2006)." European History Quarterly 39.2 (2009): 264-286.
 Wright, Gordon. Rural revolution in France. The peasantry in the twentieth century  (1964). online free toborrow
 Zeldin, Theodore. France 1848-1945 (Vol I, 1973). pp 131–97

Historiography
 Lévi‐Strauss, Laurent, and Henri Mendras. "Rural studies in France." Journal of Peasant Studies 1.3 (1974): 363-378. covers the scholarship in French.

Social history of France
Medieval society
Early modern period
History of agriculture
Rural economics
Estates (social groups)
Social class in France